The vice chairman of the Joint Chiefs of Staff (VJCS) is, by U.S. law, the second highest-ranking military officer in the United States Armed Forces, ranking just below the chairman of the Joint Chiefs of Staff. The vice chairman outranks all respective heads of each service branch, with the exception of the chairman, but does not have operational command authority over their service branches. The vice chairman assists the chairman in exercising their duties. In the absence of the chairman, the vice chairman presides over the meetings of the Joint Chiefs of Staff and performs all other duties prescribed under  and may also perform other duties that the president, the chairman, or the secretary of defense prescribes.

The 12th and current vice chairman is Admiral Christopher W. Grady, who assumed office on December 20, 2021.

Responsibilities
Although the office of Vice Chairman of the Joint Chiefs of Staff is considered to be very important and highly prestigious, neither the vice chairman nor the Joint Chiefs of Staff as a body have any command authority over combatant forces. The operational chain of command runs from the president to the secretary of defense directly to the commanders of the unified combatant commands. The vice chairman's primary duties include: "overseeing joint military requirements, representing the military in National Security Council deputies meetings, and performing other duties as directed by the chairman."

Appointment and term limitations
The vice chairman is nominated by the president for appointment from any of the regular components of the armed forces, and must be confirmed via majority vote by the Senate. The chairman and vice chairman may not be members of the same armed force service branch. However, the president may waive that restriction for a limited period of time in order to provide for the orderly transition of officers appointed to serve in those positions. The vice chairman serves a single four-year term of office at the pleasure of the president, and cannot be reappointed to serve additional terms unless in times of war or national emergency, in which case there is no limit to how many times an officer can be reappointed.

The vice chairman is also not eligible to be appointed for promotion to chairman, or any other four-star position in the armed forces, unless the president determines that it is necessary in the interest of the nation. The vice chairman assumes office on October 1 of every odd-number year, except the assumption of that term may not begin in the same year as the term of the chairman. By statute, the vice chairman is appointed as a four-star general or admiral.

History
The position of vice chairman was created by the Goldwater–Nichols Act of 1986 in order to centralize the military advisory chain of command to the president, the secretary of defense, and to the National Security Council. Originally the vice chairman was not included as a member of the Joint Chiefs of Staff, until the National Defense Authorization Act for Fiscal Year 1992 made him a full voting member. Historically, the vice chairman has served two, two-year terms before the National Defense Authorization Act for Fiscal Year 2017 amended the vice chairman's term length, beginning on January 1, 2021. The same act also set a statutory beginning term date. Prior to that, the position was filled whenever the previous holder left office.

List of vice chairmen
General Richard B. Myers and General Peter Pace were later appointed to serve as Chairman of Joint Chiefs of Staff from 2001 to 2005 and from 2005 to 2007, respectively.

Timeline

Vice Chairman by branch of service
 Air Force: 5
 Navy: 5
 Marine Corps: 2
 Army: none
 Space Force: none
 Coast Guard: none

Positional color 

The positional color (flag) of the vice chairman of the Joint Chiefs of Staff is white with a diagonal medium blue strip from upper hoist to lower fly. Centered on the flag is an American bald eagle with wings spread horizontally, in proper colors. The talons grasp three crossed arrows. A shield with blue chief and thirteen red and white stripes is on the eagle's breast. Diagonally, from upper fly to lower hoist are four five-pointed stars, medium blue on the white, two above the eagle, and two below. The fringe is yellow; the cord and tassels are medium blue and white. The design was approved by Secretary of Defense Caspar Weinberger on 20 January 1987.

See also
 Defense Acquisition Board
 Deputy's Advisory Working Group, a policy review panel co-chaired by DEPSECDEF and VJCS
 Joint Requirements Oversight Council

Notes

References

External links
 Official site

 
Joint Chiefs of Staff